Frascatore is an Italian surname. Notable people with the surname include:

John Frascatore (born 1970), American baseball player
Paolo Frascatore (born 1992), Italian footballer

Italian-language surnames